Henan University of Science and Technology (HAUST) is a comprehensive teaching and research university which ranks top three in Henan Province.  The university has 31 schools, 77 undergraduate programs, 156 Master's degree programs and 25 Doctoral degree program covering science, engineering, agriculture, medicine, economics, management science, literature, law, history, education and other 10 disciplines, with the MBA, Master of Engineering, Master of clinical Medicine, veterinary Medicine master's and professional master's degree in agricultural extension. It is granted the right to authorize a joint Ministry of Education to recruit, train units of doctoral students. The university is located in Luoyang, Henan province, China.

In 2017, the first international students were introduced to this university. Such courses included Medicine and Chinese Language.

History
The university was formerly the Luoyang Institute of Technology, which was a university specializing in science and technology courses. In 2002, Luoyang Institute of Technology, founded in 1952, was combined with Luoyang Medical School and Luoyang Agricultural School and the new HAUST was established.

External links
  

 
Educational institutions established in 1952
Universities and colleges in Henan
Education in Luoyang
1952 establishments in China